Swan Lake is an artificial lake located at the Singapore Botanic Gardens in Singapore.

See also
Symphony Lake

References

Lakes of Singapore